Olive is a genus of about 20 species of small trees in the family Oleaceae, and the fruit of those trees.

Olive may also refer to:

Color
Olive (color), a dark yellowish-green color
Olive skin, a type of skin color

Places

United States
Olive, California
Olive, Indiana
Olive, Missouri
Olive, Montana
Olive, New York
Olive, Oklahoma
Olive, Virginia
Olive, West Virginia
Olive Green (disambiguation), two places in Ohio and one in England
Olive Township (disambiguation), several places in the United States

Elsewhere
 Olive Island, an island in South Australia
 Mount Olive (disambiguation), various mountains

People
 Olive (given name)
 Olive (martyr) (Blessed Olive), a Catholic martyr from Italy
 Olive, Lady Baillie (1899–1974), Anglo-American heiress, landowner and hostess
 Fernand Olive (1891-1949), French general
 Jean-Baptiste Olive (1848–1936), French painter
 Karl Olive (born 1969), French sports journalist and politician
 Milton L. Olive, III (1946–1965), United States Army soldier during the Vietnam War
 Rich Olive (1949–2016), American politician

Arts, entertainment, and media

Fictional characters
Olive, heroine of Olive, the Other Reindeer, an animated Christmas special
Olive, The Bash St. Kids' school cook
Olive Doyle, a main character from the show A.N.T. Farm
Olive, a main character from the show Elinor Wonders Why
Olive Kitteridge, the title character of a novel by Elizabeth Strout
Agent Olive, a character from the show Odd Squad in Season 1
Olive Hoover, a main character in the film Little Miss Sunshine
Olive Hornby, a minor character important to the backstory of Harry Potter character Moaning Myrtle
Olive Oyl, Popeye's girlfriend
Olive Penderghast, the protagonist of the 2010 film Easy A
Olive Rozalski, a main character from the 2019 TV show Sydney to the Max
Olive Rudge, a character from the 1969 TV show On The Buses
Olive Snook, a character from the 2007 TV show Pushing Daisies
Olive Stone, a character from the 2018 TV show Manifest

Other uses in arts, entertainment, and media
Olive (band), an English electronic music group
Olive (film), a 1988 Australian television film
Olive (magazine), a British food magazine
Olive, a 2017 album by Sky-Hi

Biology

Plants
Saint Helena olive, a tree in the family Rhamnaceae
Canarium album (Chinese olive), a tree in the family Burseraceae with fruit resembling mediterranean olives
Olive leaf, a plant that is used medicinally

Animals
Olive baboon, Papio anubis, a species of baboon
Olive colobus, a species of primate in the family Cercopithecidae
Olive ibis, a species of bird in the family Threskiornithidae found in parts of Africa
Olive long-tailed cuckoo, a species of cuckoo in the family Cuculidae
Olive sparrow, Arremonops rufivirgatus, a species of American sparrow in the family Emberizidae
Olive thrush, one of the most common members of the thrush family (Turdidae)
Olive whistler, Pachycephala olivacea, a species of bird of the whistler family Pachycephalidae that is native to southeastern Australia
Olive woodpecker, a species of bird in the family Picidae, found in parts of Africa
Olive bee-eater, a species of bird in the family Meropidae, found in parts of Africa
Olive python, Liasis olivaceus, the second largest Australian python
Olive snout-burrower, a species of frog in the family Hemisotidae
Olive snail, a family of medium to large predatory sea snails

Other uses 
 Olive (1802 ship), launched in Calcutta
 Olive (software), a free, open-source and non-linear video editing software
 Olivary body, nicknamed the olive, a part of the brain (brainstem)
 Olive, a compression ring used in plumbing
 Mono Olive, a subproject of the Mono project
 Tropical Storm Olive (disambiguation), the name of eleven tropical cyclones

Animal common name disambiguation pages